The following is a partial list of the "B" codes for Medical Subject Headings (MeSH), as defined by the United States National Library of Medicine (NLM).

This list continues the information at List of MeSH codes (B05). Codes following these are found at List of MeSH codes (B07). For other MeSH codes, see List of MeSH codes.

The source for this content is the set of 2006 MeSH Trees from the NLM.

– plants

– chimera

– organisms, genetically modified

– plants, genetically modified

– plankton

– phytoplankton

– plant families and groups

– angiosperms
  – acanthaceae
  – adhatoda
  – andrographis
  – aceraceae
  – acer
  – acoraceae
  – acorus
  – adoxaceae
  – agavaceae
  – agave
  – yucca
  – aizoaceae
  – mesembryanthemum
  – alangiaceae
  – alismatidae
  – alismataceae
  – alisma
  – sagittaria
  – hydrocharitaceae
  – potamogetonaceae
  – zosteraceae
  – aloe
  – amaranthaceae
  – achyranthes
  – amaranthus
  – celosia
  – anacardiaceae
  – anacardium
  – mangifera
  – pistacia
  – rhus
  – semecarpus
  – toxicodendron
  – annonaceae
  – annona
  – asimina
  – guatteria
  – polyalthia
  – rollinia
  – uvaria
  – apiaceae
  – anethum graveolens
  – angelica
  – angelica archangelica
  – angelica sinensis
  – apium graveolens
  – bupleurum
  – carum
  – centella
  – cnidium
  – coriandrum
  – cuminum
  – daucus carota
  – eryngium
  – ferula
  – foeniculum
  – hemlock
  – cicuta
  – conium
  – heracleum
  – levisticum
  – ligusticum
  – oenanthe
  – pastinaca
  – petroselinum
  – pimpinella
  – sanicula
  – apocynaceae
  – alstonia
  – amsonia
  – apocynum
  – aspidosperma
  – catharanthus
  – holarrhena
  – nerium
  – ochrosia
  – rauvolfia
  – strophanthus
  – tabernaemontana
  – thevetia
  – vinca
  – voacanga
  – aquifoliaceae
  – ilex
  – ilex guayusa
  – ilex paraguariensis
  – ilex vomitoria
  – araceae
  – alocasia
  – amorphophallus
  – arisaema
  – arum
  – calla
  – colocasia
  – cyrtosperma
  – philodendron
  – pinellia
  – xanthosoma
  – zantedeschia
  – araliaceae
  – acanthopanax
  – aralia
  – eleutherococcus
  – hedera
  – kalopanax
  – oplopanax
  – panax
  – arecaceae
  – areca
  – calamus
  – cocos
  – serenoa
  – aristolochiaceae
  – aristolochia
  – asarum
  – asclepiadaceae
  – asclepias
  – calotropis
  – cryptolepis
  – cynanchum
  – gymnema
  – gymnema sylvestre
  – hemidesmus
  – marsdenia
  – periploca
  – tylophora
  – asteraceae
  – achillea
  – achyrocline
  – ageratina
  – ageratum
  – ambrosia
  – ammi
  – arctium
  – arnica
  – artemisia
  – artemisia absinthium
  – artemisia annua
  – aster plant
  – atractylis
  – atractylodes
  – baccharis
  – bidens
  – calendula
  – callilepis
  – carduus
  – carthamus
  – carthamus tinctorius
  – centaurea
  – chamomile
  – anthemis
  – chamaemelum
  – matricaria
  – tripleurospermum
  – chicory
  – chromolaena
  – chrysanthemum
  – chrysanthemum cinerariifolium
  – cirsium
  – cnicus
  – conyza
  – coreopsis
  – crepis
  – cynara
  – cynara scolymus
  – dahlia
  – echinacea
  – echinops plant
  – eclipta
  – erigeron
  – eupatorium
  – flaveria
  – geigeria
  – gnaphalium
  – grindelia
  – haplopappus
  – helianthus
  – helichrysum
  – inula
  – lettuce
  – leuzea
  – mikania
  – milk thistle
  – montanoa
  – onopordum
  – petasites
  – ratibida
  – rudbeckia
  – saussurea
  – scolymus
  – scorzonera
  – senecio
  – solidago
  – sonchus
  – stevia
  – tagetes
  – tanacetum
  – tanacetum parthenium
  – taraxacum
  – tragopogon
  – tussilago
  – verbesina
  – vernonia
  – wedelia
  – xanthium
  – balanophoraceae
  – cynomorium
  – balsaminaceae
  – impatiens
  – begoniaceae
  – berberidaceae
  – berberis
  – caulophyllum
  – epimedium
  – mahonia
  – podophyllum
  – podophyllum peltatum
  – betulaceae
  – alnus
  – betula
  – corylus
  – bignoniaceae
  – tabebuia
  – bixaceae
  – bombacaceae
  – adansonia
  – bombax
  – ceiba
  – boraginaceae
  – amsinckia
  – borago
  – comfrey
  – cordia
  – echium
  – heliotropium
  – lithospermum
  – pulmonaria
  – brassicaceae
  – arabidopsis
  – arabis
  – armoracia
  – barbarea
  – brassica
  – brassica napus
  – brassica rapa
  – mustard plant
  – Capsella (plant)
  – cardamine
  – crambe plant
  – erysimum
  – isatis
  – lepidium
  – lepidium sativum
  – nasturtium
  – raphanus
  – rorippa
  – sinapis
  – thlaspi
  – wasabia
  – bromeliaceae
  – ananas
  – bromelia
  – tillandsia
  – burseraceae
  – boswellia
  – bursera
  – commiphora
  – buxaceae
  – buxus
  – pachysandra
  – cactaceae
  – opuntia
  – calycanthaceae
  – campanulaceae
  – codonopsis
  – lobelia
  – platycodon
  – cannabaceae
  – cannabis
  – humulus
  – capparaceae
  – capparis
  – cleome
  – caprifoliaceae
  – lonicera
  – sambucus
  – sambucus nigra
  – symphoricarpos
  – viburnum
  – caricaceae
  – carica
  – caryophyllaceae
  – agrostemma
  – arenaria plant
  – dianthus
  – lychnis
  – saponaria
  – silene
  – stellaria
  – vaccaria
  – cecropiaceae
  – cecropia plant
  – celastraceae
  – catha
  – celastrus
  – euonymus
  – maytenus
  – salacia
  – tripterygium
  – chenopodiaceae
  – atriplex
  – bassia scoparia
  – beta vulgaris
  – chenopodium
  – chenopodium album
  – chenopodium ambrosioides
  – chenopodium quinoa
  – salsola
  – spinacia oleracea
  – cistaceae
  – cistus
  – clethraceae
  – combretaceae
  – combretum
  – terminalia
  – commelinaceae
  – commelina
  – tradescantia
  – convolvulaceae
  – bonamia plant
  – calystegia
  – convolvulus
  – ipomoea
  – ipomoea batatas
  – ipomoea nil
  – cornaceae
  – cornus
  – corsiaceae
  – cucurbitaceae
  – bryonia
  – citrullus
  – cucumis
  – cucumis melo
  – cucumis sativus
  – cucurbita
  – gynostemma
  – luffa
  – momordica
  – momordica charantia
  – trichosanthes
  – cuscuta
  – cyperaceae
  – carex plant
  – cyperus
  – eleocharis
  – dilleniaceae
  – dioncophyllaceae
  – dioscoreaceae
  – dioscorea
  – tamus
  – dipsacaceae
  – droseraceae
  – drosera
  – ebenaceae
  – diospyros
  – elaeagnaceae
  – hippophae
  – elaeocarpaceae
  – ericaceae
  – arctostaphylos
  – calluna
  – gaultheria
  – ledum
  – rhododendron
  – vaccinium
  – blueberry plant
  – huckleberry plant
  – vaccinium macrocarpon
  – vaccinium myrtillus
  – vaccinium vitis-idaea
  – eriocaulaceae
  – erythroxylaceae
  – coca
  – eucommiaceae
  – euphorbiaceae
  – aleurites
  – croton
  – euphorbia
  – hevea
  – hippomane
  – jatropha
  – mallotus plant
  – manihot
  – phyllanthus
  – phyllanthus emblica
  – ricinus
  – castor bean
  – sapium
  – suregada
  – fabaceae
  – abrus
  – acacia
  – albizzia
  – arachis hypogaea
  – aspalathus
  – astragalus plant
  – astragalus gummifer
  – astragalus membranaceus
  – bauhinia
  – butea
  – caesalpinia
  – cajanus
  – canavalia
  – caragana
  – cassia
  – castanospermum
  – chamaecrista
  – cicer
  – clitoria
  – crotalaria
  – cyamopsis
  – cytisus
  – dalbergia
  – derris
  – dipteryx
  – dolichos
  – erythrina
  – galega
  – genista
  – gleditsia
  – glycyrrhiza
  – glycyrrhiza uralensis
  – griffonia
  – indigofera
  – laburnum
  – lathyrus
  – lens plant
  – lespedeza
  – lotus
  – lupinus
  – maackia
  – medicago
  – medicago sativa
  – medicago truncatula
  – melilotus
  – millettia
  – mimosa
  – mucuna
  – myroxylon
  – oxytropis
  – pachyrhizus
  – peas
  – phaseolus
  – physostigma
  – prosopis
  – psoralea
  – pterocarpus
  – pueraria
  – robinia
  – senna plant
  – sesbania
  – sophora
  – soybeans
  – spartium
  – sphenostylis
  – tamarindus
  – tephrosia
  – tetrapleura
  – trifolium
  – trigonella
  – ulex
  – vicia
  – vicia faba
  – vicia sativa
  – wisteria
  – fagaceae
  – fagus
  – quercus
  – flacourtiaceae
  – casearia
  – ryania
  – fumariaceae
  – corydalis
  – fumaria
  – gentianaceae
  – centaurium
  – gentiana
  – gentianella
  – swertia
  – geraniaceae
  – geranium
  – pelargonium
  – hamamelidaceae
  – hamamelis
  – liquidambar
  – hernandiaceae
  – hippocastanaceae
  – aesculus
  – hippocrateaceae
  – hydrophyllaceae
  – eriodictyon
  – illicium
  – iridaceae
  – crocus
  – iris plant
  – juglandaceae
  – carya
  – juglans
  – krameriaceae
  – lamiaceae
  – agastache
  – ajuga
  – ballota
  – coleus
  – hedeoma
  – hyptis
  – isodon
  – lavandula
  – leonurus
  – lycopus
  – marrubium
  – melissa
  – mentha
  – mentha piperita
  – mentha pulegium
  – mentha spicata
  – monarda
  – nepeta
  – ocimum
  – ocimum basilicum
  – origanum
  – orthosiphon
  – perilla
  – perilla frutescens
  – phlomis
  – plectranthus
  – prunella
  – rabdosia
  – rosmarinus
  – salvia
  – salvia miltiorrhiza
  – salvia officinalis
  – satureja
  – scutellaria
  – scutellaria baicalensis
  – sideritis
  – stachys
  – teucrium
  – thymus plant
  – lauraceae
  – cinnamomum
  – cinnamomum aromaticum
  – cinnamomum camphora
  – cinnamomum zeylanicum
  – cryptocarya
  – laurus
  – lindera
  – litsea
  – ocotea
  – persea
  – sassafras
  – umbellularia
  – lecythidaceae
  – barringtonia
  – bertholletia
  – liliaceae
  – allium
  – chive
  – garlic
  – onions
  – shallots
  – alstroemeria
  – anemarrhena
  – asparagus plant
  – camassia
  – colchicum
  – convallaria
  – cordyline
  – crinum
  – curculigo
  – dracaena
  – fritillaria
  – galanthus
  – hemerocallis
  – hosta
  – hyacinthus
  – hypoxis
  – lilium
  – liriope plant
  – lycoris
  – narcissus
  – ophiopogon
  – ornithogalum
  – polygonatum
  – ruscus
  – sansevieria
  – scilla
  – smilacina
  – trillium
  – tulipa
  – urginea
  – veratrum
  – zigadenus
  – linaceae
  – flax
  – loganiaceae
  – gelsemium
  – strychnos
  – strychnos nux-vomica
  – lythraceae
  – cuphea
  – lagerstroemia
  – lawsonia plant
  – lythrum
  – woodfordia
  – magnoliaceae
  – liriodendron
  – magnolia
  – malpighiaceae
  – banisteriopsis
  – galphimia
  – malvaceae
  – abelmoschus
  – althaea (plant)
  – gossypium
  – hibiscus
  – malva
  – melastomataceae
  – meliaceae
  – aglaia
  – azadirachta
  – cedrela
  – melia
  – melia azedarach
  – menispermaceae
  – cissampelos
  – cocculus
  – cyclea
  – menispermum
  – sinomenium
  – stephania
  – stephania tetrandra
  – tinospora
  – mistletoe
  – loranthaceae
  – viscaceae
  – phoradendron
  – viscum
  – viscum album
  – molluginaceae
  – monimiaceae
  – peumus
  – moraceae
  – antiaris
  – artocarpus
  – broussonetia
  – ficus
  – maclura
  – morus
  – moringa
  – moringa oleifera
  – myoporaceae
  – eremophila plant
  – myoporum
  – myricaceae
  – myrica
  – myristicaceae
  – myristica fragrans
  – myrsinaceae
  – ardisia
  – embelia
  – myrtaceae
  – eucalyptus
  – eugenia
  – feijoa
  – kunzea
  – leptospermum
  – melaleuca
  – myrtus
  – pimenta
  – psidium
  – nelumbonaceae
  – nelumbo
  – nyctaginaceae
  – mirabilis
  – nymphaeaceae
  – nuphar
  – nymphaea
  – nyssaceae
  – camptotheca
  – nyssa
  – ochnaceae
  – olacaceae
  – oleaceae
  – forsythia
  – fraxinus
  – jasminum
  – ligustrum
  – olea
  – syringa
  – onagraceae
  – clarkia
  – epilobium
  – oenothera
  – oenothera biennis
  – orchidaceae
  – dendrobium
  – gastrodia
  – vanilla
  – orobanchaceae
  – cistanche
  – orobanche
  – paeonia
  – pandanaceae
  – papaveraceae
  – argemone
  – chelidonium
  – eschscholzia
  – papaver
  – sanguinaria
  – passifloraceae
  – passiflora
  – pedaliaceae
  – harpagophytum
  – sesamum
  – phytolaccaceae
  – phytolacca
  – phytolacca americana
  – phytolacca dodecandra
  – piperaceae
  – peperomia
  – piper
  – kava
  – piper betle
  – piper nigrum
  – plantago
  – plumbaginaceae
  – poaceae
  – agropyron
  – agrostis
  – andropogon
  – avena sativa
  – bambusa
  – brachiaria
  – bromus
  – cenchrus
  – coix
  – cymbopogon
  – cynodon
  – dactylis
  – digitaria
  – echinochloa
  – eleusine
  – Elymus (plant)
  – eragrostis
  – festuca
  – holcus
  – hordeum
  – lolium
  – oryza sativa
  – panicum
  – paspalum
  – pennisetum
  – phalaris
  – phleum
  – poa
  – saccharum
  – sasa
  – secale cereale
  – setaria plant
  – sorghum
  – triticum
  – vetiveria
  – zea mays
  – polygalaceae
  – polygala
  – securidaca
  – polygonaceae
  – eriogonum
  – fagopyrum
  – polygonum
  – polygonum cuspidatum
  – rheum
  – rumex
  – pontederiaceae
  – eichhornia
  – portulacaceae
  – portulaca
  – primulaceae
  – anagallis
  – cyclamen
  – primula
  – proteaceae
  – macadamia
  – punicaceae
  – pyrolaceae
  – pyrola
  – ranunculaceae
  – aconitum
  – actaea
  – adonis
  – anemone
  – aquilegia
  – cimicifuga
  – clematis
  – coptis
  – delphinium
  – helleborus
  – hydrastis
  – nigella
  – nigella damascena
  – nigella sativa
  – pulsatilla
  – ranunculus
  – semiaquilegia
  – thalictrum
  – xanthorhiza
  – resedaceae
  – rhamnaceae
  – ceanothus
  – colubrina
  – frangula
  – karwinskia
  – Rhamnus (plant)
  – ziziphus
  – rhizophoraceae
  – rosales
  – chrysobalanaceae
  – connaraceae
  – crassulaceae
  – kalanchoe
  – rhodiola
  – sedum
  – grossulariaceae
  – ribes
  – hydrangeaceae
  – hydrangea
  – rosaceae
  – agrimonia
  – alchemilla
  – crataegus
  – eriobotrya
  – filipendula
  – fragaria
  – geum
  – malus
  – photinia
  – potentilla
  – prunus
  – pygeum
  – pyracantha
  – pyrus
  – quillaja
  – rosa
  – sanguisorba
  – sorbus
  – spiraea
  – saxifragaceae
  – heuchera
  – rubiaceae
  – cephaelis
  – cinchona
  – coffea
  – galium
  – gardenia
  – hamelia
  – hedyotis
  – mitragyna
  – morinda
  – oldenlandia
  – pausinystalia
  – psychotria
  – rubia
  – uncaria
  – cat's claw
  – rutaceae
  – aegle
  – casimiroa
  – citrus
  – citrus aurantiifolia
  – citrus paradisi
  – citrus sinensis
  – dictamnus
  – evodia
  – murraya
  – phellodendron
  – pilocarpus
  – poncirus
  – ruta
  – zanthoxylum
  – salicaceae
  – populus
  – salix
  – salvadoraceae
  – santalaceae
  – pyrularia
  – santalum
  – sapindaceae
  – blighia
  – litchi
  – paullinia
  – sapindus
  – sapotaceae
  – madhuca
  – manilkara
  – mimusops
  – palaquium
  – pouteria
  – synsepalum
  – saururaceae
  – schisandraceae
  – kadsura
  – schisandra
  – scrophulariaceae
  – antirrhinum
  – bacopa
  – buddleja
  – craterostigma
  – digitalis
  – euphrasia
  – linaria
  – mimulus
  – pedicularis
  – penstemon
  – picrorhiza
  – rehmannia
  – scoparia
  – scrophularia
  – striga
  – verbascum
  – veronica
  – simaroubaceae
  – ailanthus
  – brucea
  – eurycoma
  – picrasma
  – quassia
  – simarouba
  – smilacaceae
  – smilax
  – solanaceae
  – atropa
  – atropa belladonna
  – capsicum
  – cestrum
  – datura
  – datura stramonium
  – duboisia
  – hyoscyamus
  – lycium
  – lycopersicon esculentum
  – Mandragora
  – petunia
  – physalis
  – scopolia
  – solanum
  – solanum glaucophyllum
  – solanum melongena
  – solanum nigrum
  – solanum tuberosum
  – tobacco
  – tobacco, smokeless
  – withania
  – stemonaceae
  – sterculiaceae
  – cacao
  – cola
  – sterculia
  – styracaceae
  – styrax
  – tamaricaceae
  – theales
  – actinidiaceae
  – actinidia
  – clusiaceae
  – calophyllum
  – clusia
  – garcinia
  – garcinia cambogia
  – garcinia kola
  – garcinia mangostana
  – hypericum
  – mammea
  – theaceae
  – camellia
  – camellia sinensis
  – thymelaeaceae
  – daphne
  – wikstroemia
  – tiliaceae
  – corchorus
  – grewia
  – tilia
  – triumfetta
  – tropaeolaceae
  – tropaeolum
  – turnera
  – typhaceae
  – ulmaceae
  – trema
  – ulmus
  – urticaceae
  – boehmeria
  – parietaria
  – urtica dioica
  – valerianaceae
  – nardostachys
  – patrinia
  – valerian
  – valerianella
  – verbenaceae
  – avicennia
  – callicarpa
  – clerodendrum
  – lantana
  – lippia
  – verbena
  – vitex
  – violaceae
  – viola
  – vitaceae
  – ampelopsis
  – cissus
  – vitis
  – winteraceae
  – drimys
  – pseudowintera
  – zingiberales
  – costus
  – heliconiaceae
  – marantaceae
  – musaceae
  – musa
  – strelitziaceae
  – zingiberaceae
  – alpinia
  – amomum
  – curcuma
  – elettaria
  – ginger
  – zygophyllaceae
  – balanites
  – guaiacum
  – larrea
  – peganum
  – tribulus
  – zygophyllum

– anthocerotophyta

– bryophyta
  – bryopsida
  – sphagnopsida

– equisetum

– fern
  – dennstaedtiaceae
  – pteridium
  – dryopteridaceae
  – dryopteris
  – polystichum
  – marsileaceae
  – polypodiaceae
  – polypodium
  – pteridaceae
  – adiantum
  – pteris

– gymnosperms
  – coniferophyta
  – cephalotaxus
  – cupressaceae
  – chamaecyparis
  – cupressus
  – juniperus
  – libocedrus
  – thuja
  – pinaceae
  – abies
  – cedrus
  – larix
  – picea
  – pinus
  – pinus ponderosa
  – pinus sylvestris
  – pinus taeda
  – pseudotsuga
  – tsuga
  – taxaceae
  – taxus
  – taxodiaceae
  – cryptomeria
  – cunninghamia
  – sequoia
  – sequoiadendron
  – taxodium
  – cycadophyta
  – cycas
  – zamiaceae
  – ginkgo biloba
  – gnetophyta
  – ephedra
  – ephedra sinica
  – gnetum

– hepatophyta
  – frullania
  – marchantia

– lycopodiaceae
  – huperzia
  – lycopodium

– selaginellaceae

– plant components

– plant components, aerial
  – flowering tops
  – flowers
  – pollen
  – fruit
  – nuts
  – seeds
  – plant epidermis
  – plant bark
  – plant leaves
  – pulvinus
  – plant shoots
  – cotyledon
  – hypocotyl
  – meristem
  – plant stems
  – hypocotyl
  – meristem
  – rhizome

– plant roots
  – meristem
  – plant root cap
  – mycorrhizae
  – plant tubers
  – rhizome

– plants, edible

– cereals

– crops, agricultural

– vegetables

– plants, medicinal

– plants, toxic

– seedling

– trees

The list continues at List of MeSH codes (B07).

B06